Monte Taccone is a mountain located between Liguria and Piedmont in north-western Italy. It is part of the Ligurian Apennines.

Access to the summit 
The mountain is accessible by signposted footpaths departing from Bocchetta Pass or Isoverde (municipality of Campomorone).

The Alta Via dei Monti Liguri, a long-distance trail from Ventimiglia (province of Imperia) to Bolano (province of La Spezia), passes very close to the mountain's summit.

Nature conservation 
The northern slopes of Monte Taccone are included in the Capanne di Marcarolo natural park.

References

Mountains of Liguria
Mountains of Piedmont
One-thousanders of Italy
Mountains of the Apennines